HD 6434 is a star in the southern constellation of Phoenix. Yellow dwarfs such as this are not very luminous, so at a distance of 138 light years it is not visible to the unaided eye. However, with binoculars it is readily visible under ideal observing conditions, having an apparent visual magnitude of 7.71. The star is drifting further from the Sun with a radial velocity of +23 km/s.

The star HD 6434 is named Nenque. The name was selected in the NameExoWorlds campaign by Ecuador, during the 100th anniversary of the IAU. Nenque means the Sun in the language spoken by the Indigenous Waorani tribes.

This object is a Sun-like G-type main-sequence star with a stellar classification of G2/G3V. It is an ancient population II star with an estimated age of 12 billion years, and is one of the most metal-deficient stars known to host a planet. This star is spinning at a leisurely rate with a projected rotational velocity of 2.2 km/s. It has 88% of the mass of the Sun but is nearly the same size. HD 6434 is radiating 1.2 times the luminosity of the Sun from its photosphere at an effective temperature of 5,907 K.

Planetary system
In 2000, a planet, designated , was detected in a close orbit around the star. The peer-reviewed scientific paper was published four years later.

See also
 94 Ceti
 List of extrasolar planets

References

External links

G-type main-sequence stars
Planetary systems with one confirmed planet
Phoenix (constellation)
CD–40 239
9037
006434
005054
J01044015-3929173